Dean A. Tran is an American politician from Fitchburg, Massachusetts, who was elected to the Massachusetts Senate in 2017 in a special election. He represented the Worcester and Middlesex District, and is a Republican.
Before his election to the Massachusetts Senate, Tran was a member of the Fitchburg City Council.

Early life 
Tran was born in Saigon, since renamed Ho Chi Minh City, Vietnam into a successful business family.  He emigrated with his family to the United States at the age of 4. After fleeing Vietnam by boat, Tran’s family spent two years in a refugee camp in while waiting for their application for green cards to be approved.  In 1980, he and his family were sponsored by a Catholic priest in Clinton, Massachusetts, which he calls his first real home.  In 1986, his family relocated to Fitchburg, Massachusetts where he graduated from Fitchburg High School. Tran continued his education, earning a bachelor's degree from Brandeis University in 1997.

Political career 
In 2005, Tran became the first person of color elected to the Fitchburg City Council. On December 5, 2017, after 12 years as city councilor, Tran won a special election to replace outgoing state senator Jennifer Flanagan for State Senate representing the Worcester and Middlesex district, by less than 700 votes. He ran as an advocate for fiscal discipline and low taxes. Tran is the first Vietnamese American to hold an elected office in Massachusetts.

On December 20, 2017, Tran was officially sworn in to the State Senate. His senatorial district comprises Berlin, Bolton, Precincts 1 & 2 of Clinton, Fitchburg, Gardner, Lancaster, Leominster, Lunenburg, Sterling, Townsend and Westminster in north central Massachusetts. 
Tran was re-elected in the general election in November 2018, but he lost re-election in the 2020 general election to Democrat John Cronin, also by less than 700 votes.

On February 2, 2022 Tran officially kicked off his campaign to challenge Lori Trahan in the 2022 Midterm election for the 3rd congressional district.

Leadership and Committees 

 Former Assistant Minority Whip 
 Joint Committee on Public Safety and Homeland Security (ranking Minority member)
 Joint Committee on State Administration and Regulatory Oversight
 Joint Committee on Municipalities and Regional Government
 Joint Committee on Transportation (ranking Minority member)
 Joint Committee on Higher Education
 Senate Committee on Intergovernmental Affairs
 Joint Committee on Cannabis Policy

Scandal
Tran was stripped of his leadership post, as assistant minority whip, in March 2020 after the Senate Ethics Committee ruled he violated ethics and campaign rules by having staffers work on his 2018 re-election campaign while on state time. He subsequently lost re-election in November of the same year.

As of January 2022, neither the Office of Campaign and Political Finance nor the Ethics Commission have taken any public action on these accusations. Tran stated he never had due process to give his side of the story, see the report, or know who the witnesses were.

On July 1, 2022, Tran was indicted on charges of: Larceny of a Firearm, Larceny Over $250 from Person +60/Disabled, Filing an Application for a License to Carry Containing False Information, Obtaining a Signature by False Pretenses with Intent to Defraud, Misleading a Police Investigation, Stealing by 
Confining or Putting in Fear. Tran filed suit in federal court on July 27, 2022 against Attorney General of Massachusetts Maura Healey, alleging the case against him is politically motivated by a partisan Democratic political figure. Tran pled "absolutely not guilty" on all charges on July 28, 2022.

Personal life 
Tran is married to his wife Kerry. They have four children: Isabelle, Olivia, Madilyn, and Dean. In his spare time, Tran likes to spend time with his family and is a volunteer coach for youth soccer, basketball, and baseball. Before being elected to the state senate, he served on the Corporator Board for the Central Massachusetts YMCA, and the Board of Trustees for Mount Wachusett Community College.
Tran continues to help families in need as Tran and staff were able to raise monetary donations to purchase food and Christmas gifts for the Perez children as well as give hundreds of dollars to the family to use for expenses.

Tran's daughter, Olivia, ran for a vacant Fitchburg City Council Ward 6 seat in November 2021. She earned 46% of the vote, but lost the election.

See also
 2019–2020 Massachusetts legislature

References

External links 
 Dean Tran for State Senate
 Dean Tran's Biography - Project Vote Smart
 Dean Tran's Twitter (@SenatorDeanTran)
 Tran linked to police investigation

Brandeis University alumni
Candidates in the 2022 United States House of Representatives elections
Massachusetts city council members
Republican Party Massachusetts state senators
Politicians from Fitchburg, Massachusetts
Living people
21st-century American politicians
American politicians of Vietnamese descent
Year of birth missing (living people)
Asian-American people in Massachusetts politics
Asian conservatism in the United States